The Martyrdom of a Catastrophist is the first full-length studio album from American art rock band Junius. It was released on September 4, 2009 through The Mylene Sheath and Make My Day Records in digipak, vinyl and digital download formats.

The album is based on the life and works of theorist Immanuel Velikovsky.

Reception

The Martyrdom of a Catastrophist is widely considered to be the band's most seminal work. It is their first album to garner widespread critical attention, including that of mainstream media outlets such as Pitchfork and Rolling Stone. Thus far, the album has been met with near universal acclaim.

On December 17, 2009 the album was profiled in the Rolling Stone "Hype Monitor!".

The album is currently ranked No. 21 on Sputnikmusic's top 100 highest rated albums for the year 2009.

Track listing

Track notes
Before the initial release of The Martyrdom of a Catastrophist, the tracks "Birth Rites By Torchlight" and "The Mourning Eulogy" were featured in two episodes of the horror film series Dark Path Chronicles by Mary Lambert.
The album track "Elisheva, I Love You" was added to the music video game Rock Band on March 15, 2010.

Personnel
The Martyrdom of a Catastrophist album personnel adapted from the CD liner notes

Junius
 Joseph E. Martinez - vocals, lyrics, guitar
 Michael Repasch-Nieves - guitar
 Joel Munguia - bass
 Dana Filloon - drums
Guest Appearances
 Immanuel Velikovsky - quotes
 Will Benoit, Jess Collins, Bridge Laviazar, Dave Soucy, & Orion Wainer - gang vocals
 Ira Bronson - additional writing contributions
Production
 David Collins - mastering
 Kevin Mills & Tom Syrowski - mixing, recording
 Will Benoit & James Dunham - additional vocal recording
 Brandie Doyle, Nico Essig, Derek Karlquist, Paul Lamalfa, & Jorge Velasco - engineering assistants
Art
 Drew Speziale (of Circle Takes the Square)- cover illustrations
 Matt Gauck - interior illustrations
 Michael Repasch-Nieves - layout, design
 Ira Bronson (Black Day Creative) - additional design

References

External links

 

2009 albums
Concept albums
Junius (band) albums